Nishi-Nijūhatchōme Station (西28丁目駅) is a Sapporo Municipal Subway station in Chūō-ku, Sapporo, Hokkaido, Japan. The station number is T05.

Platforms

Surrounding area
 Kitasanjonishi Post Office
 Nishi Maruyama Police Station
 Miyanomori Sports Club
 RunTime Music Entertainment, performing arts Office
 Tsutaya store Miyanomori
 North Pacific Bank, Nijuhatchome station branch

External links

 Sapporo Subway Stations

Railway stations in Japan opened in 1976
Railway stations in Sapporo
Sapporo Municipal Subway
Chūō-ku, Sapporo